Stefan Kutschke (born 3 November 1988) is a German professional footballer who plays as a forward for Dynamo Dresden.

Career statistics

References

External links
 
 

1988 births
Living people
Footballers from Dresden
German footballers
Association football forwards
Bundesliga players
2. Bundesliga players
3. Liga players
SV Babelsberg 03 players
RB Leipzig players
VfL Wolfsburg players
VfL Wolfsburg II players
SC Paderborn 07 players
Dynamo Dresden players